StarAgri is an India based agricultural marketing company providing warehousing, procurement  and Collateral Management  of Agri-Commodities. StarAgri was established in April 2006 by former ICICI Bank associates and has a presence at 190 locations across 16 Indian states. It has 800 agri commodity warehouses under its control, with a cumulative capacity of around 1.2 million metric tons. The number of employees at the company is over 500.StarAgri has five post-harvesting focus areas: agri-warehousing, procurement, collateral management, lab testing and logistics. A bulk of its revenues  (65%) are derived from warehousing services.

History
StarAgri was founded in April 2006 by four former ICICI associates: Suresh Goyal, Amith Agarwal, Amit Mudawala and Amit Khandelwal. The company was formed with an initial paid-up capital of Rs.5 lakhs. The paid-up capital was raised to Rs.50 lakhs in 2007–08.

Business Strategy
The company currently has a direct relationship with over 5,000 farmers. The organization has enabled various banks  to disburse a credit of Rs.3,000 crore as rural credit over the last five years. Its turnover in 2012-13 was Rs.73 crore with a net profit of Rs.24 crore. It is expecting a turnover  of Rs.120 crore in 2013–14. StarAgri has achieved ISO 9001:2008  & ISO 22000:2005  accreditation. It was recently announced to be one of the four unlisted companies participating in the Religare Consumer Conference 2014.

Customers
The Company collaborates with over 375 food processing companies, including Cargill India and Archer Daniels Midland and meets their demand by buying from farmers and mandis (wholesale markets). It has 15 labs to ensure purchases meet client-specifications in terms of quality and quantity. StarAgri caters to customers ranging from banks to international bulk commodity buyers, food, health  & FMCG companies and commodity exchanges. It is authorized to hold commodities worth Rs.25 billion over 110 collateral management locations through tie-ups  with some of the country's financial institutions.

Tie-Ups
StarAgri has tie-ups with 23 banks and financial institutions that give farmers credit, using agri-commodities in the warehouses as collateral.

In July 2014, StarAgri entered into Memorandum of Understanding with Karnataka Bank for extending storage facilities to farmers and finance against the warehouse receipts.

In February 2014, StarAgri tied up with Canara Bank. The partnership is to assist farmers in financing their requirements at all stages of the supply chain, ranging from pre-harvesting to the marketing and export stages.

In 2013, the company signed Memorandum of Understanding with Corporation Bank for providing finance against warehousing receipts.

In 2012, StarAgri collaborated with State Bank of India, for farmer funding and collateral management. It also entered into a partnership with Dena Bank in the same year for warehousing receipt funding.

In 2009, StarAgri tied up with Axis Bank and Punjab National Bank, for collateral management services. During the same year, the company also entered into a strategic alliance with NCDEX as a warehousing service provider.

In 2008, it tied up with IndusInd Bank for collateral management services and started operations in Haryana.

In 2007, the company launched its warehousing services with Rs 303 crore credit facility from ICICI Bank, for warehouse receipt-based funding. This was the largest ever credit facility provided by ICICI Bank.

In addition, StarAgri has collaborated with Bank of Baroda, Central Bank of India,  IDBI Bank and Kotak Mahindra Bank among others. Among financial institutions, it has collaborated with Reliance Capital and L&T Finance.

Investments by Temasek & IDFC Private Company
In 2014, Temasek Holdings invested Rs. 250 crore for a significant minority stake in the company. The funds will be utilized in developing assets like warehouses, supply chain & logistics facilities.

In 2012, IDFC Private Equity, invested Rs.150 crore in the company through IDFC PE Fund III for a significant minority stake. This was IDFC's first PE first transaction in agri-services company and its maiden investment in an “Integrated Independent Post Harvest Management Company”.  StarAgri will direct this investment towards expanding high quality warehouse network and also for creating a pan India footprint of the allied post-harvest management services.

Future
Over time, the company plans to spin off its agri-finance division into an NBFC. In addition, it intends to create 50 private mandis licensed by the Agricultural Produce Marketing Committee, which will provide infrastructure services to farmers which are not easily available at regular mandi. Further, StarAgri aims to build silos that will create additional capacity of 2.5 million tonnes to its existing warehousing capacity.

Joint Venture
Taaza Plaza is a Public Private Partnership (PPP) between Star Agriwarehousing & Collateral Management Ltd. (StarAgri) along with Fuzion Inc. Pvt. Ltd. (Fuzion) and the Maharashtra State Agriculture Marketing Board (MSAMB. It is built on the model of sourcing directly from farmer groups across agri-states and making fresh produce available to the end consumer by bypassing intermediaries. The "retail on wheels" shops visit housing societies and similar busy intersections where common people like homemakers can buy their daily produce.

References

Agriculture companies of India